Bodzanówek refers to the following places in Poland:

 Bodzanówek, Radziejów County
 Bodzanówek, Włocławek County